Robin Wolaner (born 1954) is an entrepreneur and business author. In February 2015 she became COO of We Care Solar, a nonprofit that provides its Solar Suitcase to power last-mile health clinics in the developing world. In September 2015 the United Nations' Department of Economic and Social Affairs awarded We Care Solar the inaugural "Powering the Future We Want" award for innovations in sustainable development.

Currently a director of Credo mobile, she is the founder of TeeBeeDee, an online network for baby boomers that launched in 2007 and folded in 2009. She was an executive at CNET from 1997 to 2002; after leaving CNET, she wrote a book of business advice for women and became an advisor to tech startups. In 1985, she founded Parenting magazine, later sold to Time Inc.  Her founding of Parenting is documented in one of the most popular case studies by Harvard Business School, taught to all first-year students of the school.  She graduated from Cornell University in 1975 with a bachelor of science in industrial and labor relations.

Notes

References
R. Wolaner, Naked In The Boardroom: A CEO Bares Her Secrets So You Can Transform Your Career, Fireside (2005) .
http://pandodaily.com/2013/06/27/non-profit-vittana-lands-cnets-wolaner-as-ceo/
http://www.nytimes.com/1990/04/08/business/beating-time-warner-at-its-own-game.html?pagewanted=all&src=pm
https://www.telegraph.co.uk/technology/2019/06/29/forever-young-hidden-age-discrimination-scandal-tech-industry/

External links
Vittana
Podcast

1954 births
American businesspeople
Cornell University School of Industrial and Labor Relations alumni
Living people